WPXA-TV (channel 14) is a television station licensed to Rome, Georgia, United States, broadcasting the Ion Television network to the Atlanta area. The station is owned and operated by the Ion Media subsidiary of the E. W. Scripps Company, and maintains offices on North Cobb Parkway (US 41) in Marietta; its transmitter is located on Bear Mountain, near the Cherokee–Bartow county line. Despite Rome being WPXA-TV's city of license, the station maintains no physical presence there.

The station's broadcast range extends into parts of Alabama and Chattanooga, Tennessee and even the southwest corner of North Carolina. However, terrain shielding not accounted for in radio propagation models prevents this from regularly occurring, due to the north Georgia mountains.

History
The station was issued a construction permit in 1984 on Channel 14 as WZGA, but never made it to air. The station went on-air February 29, 1988 as WAWA, with studios on Shorter Avenue in Rome and transmitter on nearby Mount Alto. The station was owned by Sudbrink Broadcasting of West Palm Beach, Florida, and had a general entertainment format of low-budget shows, public domain movies, and local newscasts. It also aired several ABC, CBS and NBC shows that WSB-TV (channel 2), WAGA-TV (channel 5) and WXIA-TV (channel 11) turned down.

In 1990, the station changed its calls to WTLK-TV and moved its studios to Marietta and transmitter to Bear Mountain (west of Canton). Rebranding as "Talk TV", it featured national talk shows like Phil Donahue and Sally Jessy Raphael. It also aired local shows (with TV studio audiences) with WSB's Neal Boortz, former Miss America Suzette Charles, Hosea Williams, Michael Young, WVEE's Mike Roberts, WGST's Brian Wilson and others, while also continuing to air some preempted network programs. However, the station never took off in metro Atlanta during the days before the must-carry rules for cable systems. The other independent on the fringe of the market, Athens-licensed WNGM-TV (channel 34, now WUVG), had the same problem. Later in the 1990s, WTLK ran blocks of country music videos along with infomercials.

In 1996, the station was sold to Paxson Communications. The must-carry rules for cable systems took effect about the same time. WTLK, WNGM and WATC would be added to most metro cable systems immediately. The station's format consisted of infomercials by day and the Worship Network at night. Pax TV was launched in 1998 and WTLK became WPXA as a charter affiliate. Pax TV later became i: Independent Television and is now Ion Television. During the Pax era, WPXA aired a late-night replay of WXIA's 11 p.m. newscast. Most Pax stations had similar arrangements with the NBC affiliates in their markets.

The station's broadcast tower on Bear Mountain was also the first location for WCHK-FM (105.5), now WBZY (105.7 FM) on Sweat Mountain.

Rome also had a previous full-power TV station, WROM-TV (channel 9), from 1953 to 1957. This station later moved to Chattanooga and became what is now WTVC.

Technical information

Subchannels
The station's digital signal is multiplexed:

The Worship Network was originally on 14.4 until the end of January 2010, when it was dropped from all Ion stations.

The station had selected 14 as its permanent digital channel in the digital channel election, but had to remain on 51 due to a co-channel RF interference conflict.

In August 2013, the station contracted with local Telemundo affiliate WKTB-CD (channel 47) to provide a full-market signal for the low-power station, along with probable retransmission consent to fold it in with WPXA's negotiations. This precluded WPXA from Ion's agreement to carry the over-the-air signal of Home Shopping Network on its DT6 subchannel later in the year, though HSN already was carried by W45DX-D (channel 45) over-the-air in the market.

On July 6, 2015, WPXA-TV was licensed by the FCC to shift their digital signal from channel 51 to channel 31 to allow T-Mobile to use the adjacent channel 52 frequency for LTE data and voice services without interference, requiring a tuner re-scan for viewers to continue to receive the station; using PSIP to display WPXA-TV's virtual channel as 14 on digital television receivers.

In September 2019, WPXA-TV moved from physical channel 31 (583.31MHz) to 16 (493.31MHz) as a result of the spectrum incentive auction, which revoked channels 38 to 51 from the UHF TV bandplan, repacking those stations into channels 2 to 36 and forcing some stations already in the lower band to move around to accommodate them. This change was expected to occur by 12 a.m. on September 6, which was ATSC tuner "rescan day" for most stations in the Atlanta media market. However for WPXA this was delayed to the 11th for unknown reasons, in turn preventing WPCH-TV 17.x from changing from RF channel 20 to 31 until then.

References

External links

FCC map of WPXA

Ion Television affiliates
Court TV affiliates
Laff (TV network) affiliates
Ion Mystery affiliates
Defy TV affiliates
TrueReal affiliates
Scripps News affiliates
E. W. Scripps Company television stations
Television channels and stations established in 1988
1988 establishments in Georgia (U.S. state)
PXA-TV
Rome, Georgia